Harpinder Singh Chawla is an Indian dental surgeon, medical researcher and writer, known for his work in pediatric dentistry. Born on 15 March 1945 to Sukhdev Singh and Iqbal Kaur Chawla in Amritsar, the temple town in the Indian state of Punjab, he graduated in Dentistry from the Government Dental College and Hospital, Amritsar in 1967. He did his post graduation in the speciality of pedodontics and preventive dentistry from the same college in 1970. He joined   Institute of Medical Education and Research in 1970.He started his career as a registrar at the Post Graduate Institute of Medical Education and Research (PGIMER), Chandigarh in 1970 and worked in several capacities such as lecturer, assistant professor, associate professor and professor and is the incumbent Head of the Oral Health Science Center of PGIMER.

Chawla is known to have been involved in medical research and has published his research findings as several articles in peer reviewed journals. He is a former president of the Asian Academy of Preventive Dentistry and a member and elected Fellow of the National Academy of Medical Sciences (NAMS) as well as the Indian Society Pedodontics and Preventive Dentistry. The Government of India awarded him the fourth highest civilian honour of the Padma Shri, in 2007, for his contributions to Indian medicine.He was also bestowed with the Punjab Ratan  in 2006 He is married to Kiran Chaudhary and the couple has a son and a daughter.

See also 
 myelodysplastic syndrome

References 

Recipients of the Padma Shri in medicine
1945 births
People from Amritsar district
Medical doctors from Punjab, India
Indian dentists
Indian medical researchers
Indian medical writers
Indian medical academics
Living people
Punjabi people
Fellows of the National Academy of Medical Sciences
Academic staff of the Postgraduate Institute of Medical Education and Research